In polyatomic cations with the chemical formula  (where R is a hydrogen or an alkyl, aryl, or halide group).  These cations have tetrahedral structures.  The salts are generally colorless or take the color of the anions.

Types of phosphonium cations

Protonated phosphines
Salts of the parent  are rarely encountered, but this ion is an intermediate in the preparation of the industrially useful tetrakis(hydroxymethyl)phosphonium chloride:
PH3 + HCl + 4 CH2O → 

Many organophosphonium salts are produced by protonation of primary, secondary, and tertiary phosphines:
PR3 + H+ → 
The basicity of phosphines follows the usual trends, with R = alkyl being more basic than R = aryl.

Tetraorganophosphonium cations
The most common phosphonium compounds have four organic substituents attached to phosphorus. The quaternary phosphonium cations include tetraphenylphosphonium, (C6H5)4P+ and tetramethylphosphonium .

Quaternary phosphonium cations are produced by alkylation of organophosphines. For example, the reaction of triphenylphosphine with methyl bromide gives methyltriphenylphosphonium bromide:
PPh3 + CH3Br → [CH3PPh3]+Br−
The methyl group in such phosphonium salts is mildly acidic, with a pKa estimated to be near 15:
[CH3PPh3]+ + base → CH2=PPh3 +  [Hbase]+
This deprotonation reaction gives Wittig reagents.

Phosphorus pentachloride and related compounds
Solid phosphorus pentachloride is an ionic compound, formulated , that is, a salt containing the tetrachlorophosphonium cation. Dilute solutions dissociate according to the following equilibrium:
PCl5   + Cl−

Triphenylphosphine dichloride (Ph3PCl2) exists both as the pentacoordinate phosphorane and as the chlorotriphenylphosphonium chloride, depending on the medium. The situation is similar to that of PCl5. It is an ionic compound (PPh3Cl)+Cl− in polar solutions and a molecular species with trigonal bipyramidal molecular geometry in apolar solution.

Alkoxyphosphonium salts: Arbuzov reaction
The Michaelis–Arbuzov reaction is the chemical reaction of a trivalent phosphorus ester with an alkyl halide to form a pentavalent phosphorus species and another alkyl halide.  Commonly, the phosphorus substrate is a phosphite ester (P(OR)3) and the alkylating agent is an alkyl iodide.

Uses

Textile finishes
 
Tetrakis(hydroxymethyl)phosphonium chloride has industrial importance in the production of crease-resistant and flame-retardant finishes on cotton textiles and other cellulosic fabrics. A flame-retardant finish can be prepared from THPC by the Proban Process, in which THPC is treated with urea. The urea condenses with the hydroxymethyl groups on THPC. The phosphonium structure is converted to phosphine oxide as the result of this reaction.

Phase-transfer catalysts and precipitating agents
Organic phosphonium cations are lipophilic and can be useful in phase transfer catalysis, much like quaternary ammonium salts. Salts or inorganic anions and tetraphenylphosphonium are soluble in polar organic solvents. One example is the perrhenate (PPh4[ReO4]).

Reagents for organic synthesis
Wittig reagents are used in organic synthesis. They are derived from phosphonium salts. A strong base such as butyllithium or sodium amide is required for the deprotonation:
[Ph3P+CH2R]X− + C4H9Li → Ph3P=CHR + LiX + C4H10

One of the simplest ylides is methylenetriphenylphosphorane (Ph3P=CH2).

The compounds Ph3PX2 (X = Cl, Br) are used in the Kirsanov reaction.
The Kinnear–Perren reaction is used to prepare alkylphosphonyl dichlorides (RP(O)Cl2) and esters (RP(O)(OR′)2). A key intermediate are alkyltrichlorophosphonium salts, obtained by the alkylation of phosphorus trichloride:
RCl + PCl3 + AlCl3 → [RPCl3]+

Ammonia production for "green hydrogen"
The main industrial procedure for the production of ammonia today is the thermal Haber-Bosch process, which generally uses fossil gas as a source of hydrogen, which is then combined with nitrogen to produce ammonia. In 2021, Professor Doug MacFarlane and collaborators Alexandr Simonov and Bryan Suryanto of Monash University devised a method of producing green ammonia that has the potential to make Haber-Bosch plants obsolete. Their process is similar to the electrolysis approach for producing hydrogen. While working with local company Verdant, which wanted to make bleach from saltwater by electrolysis, Suryanto discovered that a tetraalkyl phosphonium salt allowed the efficient production of ammonia at room temperature.

See also
Ammonium
Hydronium (H3O+)
Onium compounds
 Organophosphorus chemistry

References 

Cations
Functional groups
Phosphonium compounds